Paulus is the original Latin form of the English name Paul. It may refer to:

Ancient Roman 
 Paul (jurist) or Julius Paulus (fl. 222–235 AD), Roman jurist
 Paulus (consul 496), politician of the Eastern Roman Empire
 Paulus (consul 512), Roman politician
 Paulus Catena (fl. 353–362 AD), Roman notary
 Lucius Aemilius Paulus Macedonicus (229–160 BC), Roman general

Christianity

Popes 
 Pope Paul I (Pope from 757–767)
 Pope Paul II (Pope from 1417–1471)
 Pope Paul III (Pope from 1534–1549)
 Pope Paul IV (Pope from 1555–1559)
 Pope Paul V (Pope from 1605–1621)
 Pope Paul VI (Pope from 1963–1978)

Other Christians 
 Paul the Apostle (5–67 AD)
 Paulus (bishop of Alexandretta) (fl. 518), Bishop of Alexandria Minor
 Paul the Deacon or Paulus Diaconus (ca. 720 – 800 AD), Italian Benedictine monk
 Paulus Jovius (1483–1552), Italian bishop
 Paulus (oratorio), 1836 oratorio by Mendelssohn

Various 
 Paulus (surname), includes a list of people with the surname
 Paul of Aegina or Paulus Aegineta (625–690 AD), Greek surgeon
 Paulus Alexandrinus (fl. 378 AD), Hellenistic astrologer
 Paulus Castrensis (fl. 1390–1441), Italian jurist
 Paulus Jansen (born 1954), Dutch politician
 Paulus Potter (1625–1654), Dutch painter
 Paulus Rundgren, Finnish ice hockey player
 Paulus the woodgnome, children's book character by Jan van Oort (Jean Dulieu)

See also
Paulis (disambiguation)

Dutch masculine given names